Doctor Slump is an upcoming South Korean television series written by Baek Sun-woo, directed by Oh Hyun-jong, and starring Park Shin-hye, Park Hyung-sik, Yoon Park, and Kong Seong-ha. It is scheduled for release on JTBC in the second half of 2023.

Synopsis 
Doctor Slump is about the growth and love of Nam Ha-neul (Park Shin-hye) and Yeo Jeong-woo (Park Hyung-sik) who had promising prospects but fell into a slump and quit their jobs as doctors and live in a rooftop room.

Cast

Main 
 Park Shin-hye as Nam Ha-neul
 A female doctor who runs out of the hospital after being burned by a medical professor.
 Park Hyung-sik as Yeo Jeong-woo
 A plastic surgeon who was popular but suffered from a medical accident.
 Yoon Park as Bin Dae-yeong
 A plastic surgeon who has an 'alone' rivalry with his well-known college classmate Jeong-woo.
  as Lee Hong-ran
 An anesthesiologist and Ha-neul's best friend.

Production 
The first script reading was held on March 4, 2023, and filming began the same month.

Notes

References

External links 

 
 

JTBC television dramas
2023 South Korean television series debuts
Korean-language television shows
South Korean medical television series
South Korean romantic comedy television series
Television series by JTBC Studios
Upcoming television series